is a Japanese politician and the current governor of Iwate Prefecture. He is a native of Morioka and graduate of the University of Tokyo.

Biography 
Tasso joined the Ministry of Foreign Affairs in 1988, receiving a master's degree in international relations from Johns Hopkins University in the United States while with the ministry. In 1996, he was elected to the House of Representatives in the Diet (national legislature) for the first time as a member of the New Frontier Party and subsequently served as a diet member for the Democratic Party of Japan. He was first elected governor of Iwate prefecture in 2007 and as of 2012 is in his second four-year term.

On July 9, 2012, he announced that he would sever his ties with the DPJ and join Putting People's Lives First, the new party led by Ichiro Ozawa.

References

External links 
  

1964 births
Living people
People from Morioka, Iwate
University of Tokyo alumni
Johns Hopkins University alumni
Members of the House of Representatives (Japan)
New Frontier Party (Japan) politicians
20th-century Japanese politicians
21st-century Japanese politicians
Governors of Iwate Prefecture
Politicians from Iwate Prefecture